The Forest of Chailluz is a wooded area comprising 1,673 hectares, located in Besançon, in the Doubs, France. It is bisected by Highway A36.

Quarry 

 Historically, quarries in Chailluz provided the chalky, blue and beige mottled stone from which the majority of old buildings in the center of Besançon were built.

Notable sites 
 Hamlet of the "Grandes Baraques"
 Fort de Chailluz (Fort de la Dame Blanche; Fort of the White Lady)

References

Chailluz
Building stone
Forests of France